Below is the list of populated places in Konya Province, Turkey by the districts. The first three districts (Karatay, Meran and Selçuklu) are parts of the city of Greater Konya. In the following lists, the first place in each district list is the administrative center of that district.

Karatay 

 Karatay
 Acıdort
 Akbaş
 Akörenkışla
 Aksaklı
 Bakırtolu
 Başgötüren
 Beşağıl
 Büyükburnak
 Çengilti
 Divanlar
 Esentepe
 Göçü
 İpekler
 Karadona
 Karakaya
 Katrancı
 Kızören
 Köseali
 Obruk
 Sürüç
 Yağlıbayat
 Yavşankuyu
 Yenice
 Yenikent
 Zincirli

Meram 

 Meram
 Bayat
 Botsa
 Çayırbağı
 Çomaklar
 Çukurçimen
 Erenkaya
 Evliyatekke
 Gökyurt
 Hasanşeyh
 Hatip
 İkipınar
 İlyasbaba
 Karaağaç
 Kayadibi
 Kayalı
 Kayıhüyük
 Kumralı
 Sadıklar
 Sarıkız
 Yatağan
 Yeşildere
 Yeşiltekke

Selçuklu 

 Seçuklu
 Akpınar
 Bağrıkurt
 Biçer
 Çaldere
 Çaltı
 Çandır
 Dağdere
 Eğribayat
 Güvenç
 Kaleköy
 Karaömerler
 Kervan
 Kınık
 Kızılcakuyu
 Küçükmuhsine
 Meydanköy
 Sarıcalar
 Selahattin
 Ulumuhsine
 Yazıbelen

Ahırlı 

 Ahırlı  
 Aliçerçi
 Bademli
 Balıklava
 Büyüköz
 Çiftlikköy
 Erdoğan
 Karacakuyu
 Kayacık
 Kuruçay
 Küçüköz

Akören 

 Akören
 Ahmediye
 Alanköy
 Belkuyu
 Çatören
 Dutlu
 Karahüyük
 Orhaniye
 Süleymaniye

Akşehir 

 Akşehir
 Alanyurt
 Bozlağan
 Cankurtaran
 Çamlı
 Çimendere
 Değirmenköy
 Gedil
 Gözpınarı
 Ilıcak
 Karabulut
 Ortaca
 Sarayköy
 Savaş
 Sorkun
 Söğütlü
 Tekkeköy
 Tipiköy
 Ulupınar
 Üçhüyük
 Yaşarlar
 Yaylabelen
 Yeniköy
 Yeşilköy

Altınekin 

 Altınekin
 Akçaşar
 Akköy
 Ayışığı
 Borukkuyu
 Hacınuman
 Karakaya
 Koçaş
 Koçyaka
 Mantar
 Ölmez
 Sarnıçköy
 Topraklık
 Yenikuyu
 Yeniyayla

Beyşehir 

 Beyşehir
 Ağılönü
 Akburun
 Avdancık
 Bademli
 Başgöze
 Bayat
 Bayındır
 Bektemir
 Çiçekler
 Çiftlikköy
 Çivril
 Çukurağıl
 Damlapınar
 Doğancık
 Dumanlı
 Eğirler
 Eğlikler
 Fasıllar
 Göçü
 Gökçekuyu
 Gölkaşı
 Gönen
 Gündoğdu
 Hüseyinler
 İsaköy
 Karabayat
 Karadiken
 Karahisar
 Kuşluca
 Küçükafşar
 Mesutlar
 Sarıköy
 Şamlar
 Üçpınar
 Yazyurdu
 Yukarıesence
 Yunuslar

Bozkır 

 Bozkır
 Akçapınar
 Armutlu
 Arslantaş
 Aydınkışla
 Ayvalıca
 Bağyurdu
 Baybağan
 Boyalı
 Bozdam
 Çat
 Dere
 Elmaağaç
 Ferhatlar
 Hacılar
 Hacıyunuslar
 Işıklar
 Karabayır
 Karacaardıç
 Karacahisar
 Karayahya
 Kayacılar
 Kayapınar
 Kınık
 Kızılçakır
 Kildere
 Kovanlık
 Kozağaç
 Kuşça
 Küçükhisarlık
 Pınarcık
 Sazlı
 Soğucak
 Sorkun
 Tarlabaşı
 Taşbaşı
 Tepearası
 Tepelice
 Ulupınar
 Yalnızca
 Yazdamı
 Yelbeyi
 Yeniköy
 Yolören

Cihanbeyli 

 Cihanbeyli
 Ağabeyli
 Beyliova
 Böğrüdelik
 Çimen
 Çölyaylası
 Damlakuyu
 Hodoğlu
 Kayı
 Kırkışla
 Korkmazlar
 Küçükbeşkavak
 Mutlukonak
 Sağlık
 Sığırcık
 Turanlar
 Tüfekçipınarı
 Uzuncayayla
 Yeşildere
 Yünlükuyu
 Zaferiye

Çeltik 

 Çeltik
 Adakasım
 Doğanyurt
 İshakuşağı
 Kaşören
 Torunlar
 Yukarıaliçomak

Çumra 

Çumra
 Abditolu
 Adakale
 Afşar
 Alemdar
 Alibeyhüyüğü
 Apasaraycık
 Avdul
 Balçıkhisar
 Beylerce
 Büyükaşlama
 Çiçek
 Çukurkavak
 Dedemoğlu
 Dineksaray
 Dinlendik
 Doğanlı
 Erentepe
 Fethiye
 Gökhüyük
 İnli
 Kuzucu
 Küçükköy
 Seçme
 Sürgüç
 Tahtalı
 Taşağıl
 Türkmenkarahüyük
 Uzunkuyu
 Üçhüyükler
 Ürünlü
 Yürükcamili

Derbent 

 Derbent
 Değiş
 Derbenttekke
 Güneyköy
 Mülayim
 Saraypınar
 Yassıören

Derebucak 

 Derebucak
 Durak
 Taşlıpınar
 Tepearası
 Uğurlu

Doğanhisar 

 Doğanhisar
 Fırınlı
 Güvendik
 İlyaslar
 Kemer
 Tekkeköy
 Uncular
 Yazır
 Yazlıca

Emirgazi 

 Emirgazi
 Besci
 Gölören
 İkizli
 Karaören
 Meşeli
 Öbektaş
 Yamaçköy

Ereğli

 Ereğli
 Acıkuyu
 Acıpınar
 Adabağ
 Akhüyük
 Alhan
 Aşağıgöndelen
 Aşıklar
 Bahçeli
 Belceağaç
 Beyköy
 Beyören
 Bulgurluk
 Burhaniye
 Büyükdede
 Çakmak
 Çiller
 Çimencik
 Gaybi
 Gökçeyazı
 Göktöme
 Hacımemiş
 Kamışlıkuyu
 Karaburun
 Kargacı
 Kızılgedik
 Kuskuncuk
 Kuzukuyu
 Mellicek
 Orhaniye
 Özgürler
 Pınarözü
 Sarıca
 Sarıtopallı
 Servili
 Taşağıl
 Taşbudak
 Tatlıkuyu
 Türkmen
 Ulumeşe
 Yazlık
 Yellice
 Yeniköy
 Yıldızlı
 Yukarıgöndelen

Güneysınır 

 Güneysınır
 Ağaçoba
 Avcıtepe
 Gürağaç
 Habiller
 Karagüney
 Kayaağzı
 Kızılöz
 Kurukavak
 Mehmetali
 Ömeroğlu
 Örenboyalı
 Sarıhacı

Hadim 

 Hadim
 Ağaççı
 Aşağıeşenler
 Aşağıkızılkaya
 Beyreli
 Çiftepınar
 Dülgerler
 Fakılar
 Gaziler
 Göynükkışla
 Gülpınar
 İğdeören
 Kalınağıl
 Kaplanlı
 Küplüce
 Oduncu
 Sarnıç
 Selahattin
 Umurlar
 Yağcı
 Yelmez
 Yenikonak
 Yukarıeşenler

Halkapınar 

 Halkapınar
 Büyükdoğan
 Çakıllar
 Dedeli
 Delimahmutlu
 Eskihisar
 İvriz
 Karayusuflu
 Kayasaray
 Körlü
 Kösere
 Osmanköseli
 Seydifakılı
 Yassıkaya
 Yayıklı
 Yeşilyurt

Hüyük 

 Hüyük
 Başlamış
 Budak
 Çukurkent
 Değirmenaltı
 Görünmez
 Pınarbaşı
 Suludere
 Tolca
 Yenice

Ilgın 

 Ilgın
 Ağalar
 Avdan
 Barakmuslu
 Belekler
 Boğazkent
 Bulcuk
 Büyükoba
 Çatak
 Çobankaya
 Çömlekçi
 Dereköy
 Dığrak
 Düğer
 Eldeş
 Geçitköy
 Gedikören
 Gökbudak
 Gölyaka
 Güneypınar
 Harmanyazı
 İhsaniye
 Kaleköy
 Kapaklı
 Karaköy
 Köstere
 Mahmuthisar
 Mecidiye
 Misafirli
 Olukpınar
 Orhaniye
 Ormanözü
 Sadıkköy
 Sebiller
 Tekeler
 Yorazlar
 Zaferiye

Kadınhanı 

 Kadınhanı
 Afşarlı
 Alabağ
 Bakırpınar
 Bayramlı
 Beykavağı
 Bulgurpınarı
 Çavdar
 Çeşmecik
 Çubuk
 Demiroluk
 Hacımehmetli
 Hacıoflazlar
 Hacıpirli
 Kabacalı
 Kamışlıözü
 Karahisarlı
 Karakurtlu
 Karasevinç
 Karayürüklü
 Kızılkuyu
 Konurören
 Kökez
 Köylütolu
 Kurthasanlı
 Küçükkuyu
 Mahmudiye
 Meydanlı
 Örnekköy
 Pirali
 Pusat
 Saçıkara
 Sarıkaya
 Söğütözü
 Şahören
 Tosunoğlu
 Yağlıca
 Yaylayaka

Karapınar 

 Karapınar
 Akçayazı
 Akören
 Çiğil
 Hasanoba
 Karakışla
 Kayacık
 Kazanhüyüğü
 Kesmez
 Küçükaşlama
 Ortaoba
 Oymalı
 Sazlıpınar
 Yağmapınar
 Yenikuyu

Kulu 

 Kulu
 Acıkuyu
 Ağılbaşı
 Altılar
 Arşıncı
 Beşkardeş
 Boğazören
 Bozan
 Burunağıl
 Canımana
 Dipdede
 Doğutepe
 Fevziye
 Gökler
 Güzelyayla
 Hisarköy
 Karacadere
 Kırkkuyu
 Kömüşini
 Köşker
 Sarıyayla
 Seyitahmetli
 Soğukkuyu
 Şerefli
 Tavlıören
 Yaraşlı
 Yazıçayırı
 Yeşiltepe
 Yeşilyurt

Sarayönü 

 Sarayönü
 Bahçesaray
 Boyalı
 Büyükzengi
 Değirmenli
 Ertugrul
 Karabıyık
 Karatepe
 Kayıören
 Konar
 Kuyulusebil
 Özkent
 Yenicekaya

Seydişehir 

 Seydişehir
 Aşağıkaraören
 Başkaraören
 Boyalı
 Bükçe
 Çatköy
 Çatmakaya
 Dikilitaş
 Gökçehüyük
 Gökhüyük
 Gölyüzü
 Irmaklı
 İncesu
 Karabulak
 Karacaören
 Kavakköy
 Kızılca
 Kozlu
 Kumluca
 Kuran
 Madenli
 Mesudiye
 Muradiye
 Oğlakçı
 Ortakaraören
 Saraycık
 Susuz
 Taşağıl
 Tepecik
 Tolköy
 Ufacık
 Yaylacık
 Yenice

Taşkent 

 Taşkent
 Keçimen
 Kongul
 Sazak

Tuzlukçu 

 Tuzlukçu
 Çöğürlü
 Dursunlu
 Erdoğdu
 Gürsu
 Konarı
 Koraşı
 Köklüce
 Kundullu
 Mevlütlü
 Pazarkaya
 Subatan

Yalıhüyük 

 Yalıhüyük
 Arasöğüt
 Sarayköy

Yunak 

 Yunak
 Altınöz
 Ayrıtepe
 Beşışıklı
 Böğrüdelik
 Cebrail
 Çayırbaşı
 Eğrikuyu
 Hacıfakılı
 Hacıömeroğlu
 Harunlar
 Hatırlı
 Hursunlu
 İmamoğlu
 Karayayla
 Kargalı
 Kıllar
 Kurtuşağı
 Kuyubaşı
 Meşelik
 Odabaşı
 Ortakışla
 Özyayla
 Sertler
 Sevinç
 Sıram
 Sinanlı
 Yavaşlı
 Yeşiloba
 Yeşilyayla
 Yığar

References

List
Central Anatolia Region
Konya